The 1952 Richmond Spiders football team was an American football team that represented the University of Richmond as a member of the Southern Conference (SoCon) during the 1952 college football season. In their second season under head coach Ed Merrick, Richmond compiled a 1–9 record, with a mark of 0–6 in conference play, finishing tied for 15th place in the SoCon.

Schedule

References

Richmond
Richmond Spiders football seasons
Richmond Spiders football